Museum of Arts and Crafts may refer to:

 Kentucky Museum of Art and Craft, Louisville, Kentucky, USA
 Musée des Arts et Métiers, Paris, France
 Museum für Kunst und Gewerbe Hamburg, Germany
 Museum of Arts and Crafts, Zagreb, Croatia
 Museum of the American Arts and Crafts Movement, St. Petersburg, Florida, USA